The Hepatitis B virus PRE stem-loop beta (HBV PRE SL-beta) is an RNA structure that is shown to play a role in nuclear export of HBV mRNAs.

The minimal HBV PREbeta structure consists of a 23 nt stem-loop, with a 9 nt apical loop. The conserved stem-loop was predicted within the HBV PRE sequence and confirmed by mutagenesis.

See also
Hepatitis B virus PRE alpha
HBV RNA encapsidation signal epsilon
Hepatitis B virus PRE 1151–1410

References

Cis-regulatory RNA elements
Hepatitis B virus